Night's Sorceries (1987) is a fantasy collection by British writer  Tanith Lee, the fifth and final volume in her series Tales From The Flat Earth. Composed of seven novellas and novelettes, it was nominated for World Fantasy Award's Best Anthology/Collection in 1988.

References

External links
Page at Internet Speculative Fiction Database

1987 British novels
1987 fantasy novels
Novels by Tanith Lee
British novellas
DAW Books books